The Pegas Discus is a Czech two-place paraglider that was designed and produced by Pegas 2000 of Prague. It is now out of production.

Design and development
The aircraft was designed as a tandem glider for flight training and as such was referred to as the Discus Bi, indicating "bi-place" or two seater.

The design progressed through two generations of models, the Discus 1 and 2, each improving on the last. The models are each named for their approximate wing area in square metres.

Variants
Discus 2 40 Bi
Small-sized model for lighter pilots.
Discus 2 45 Bi
Large-sized model for heavier pilots.

Specifications (Discus 2 40)

References

Discus
Paragliders